Alfonso Simonetti (Naples, December 29, 1840 – 1892) was an Italian painter, mainly of Romantic-style nocturnal landscapes, illuminated by moonlight.

Biography
He completed his studies in the Royal Institute of Fine Arts of Naples, where he studied under Gabriele Smargiassi and Giuseppe Mancinelli and gained a stipend from the local government to study in Florence in 1864. He painted both portraits and historical themes. At the 1880 Exposition artistica of Turin, he exhibited the canvas of La malaria and La serenata (nocturnal effect). In 1877, in Naples, exhibited: Without Hope, she is Dead and The last Ray. He painted a Via Giuseppe Mancinelli. at the Exposiziono Universale of Paris he exhibited a copy of this painting. To that of Milan, he sent Ancora non torna (nocturnal effect) and Dopo l'uragano. To the 1883 Exposition of Rome, he sent a large landscape: Tramonto. In 1887 in Venice, he submitted two landscapes: Selva milord; Raccolta degli ulivi. At the Italian Exposition of London, he displayed: Forest; Countryside of Castrocielo, and the historical canvas: Gutenberg, Faust and Coeffer print the first page of the Bible. In Melbourne, Australia, he exhibited Costume of Castrocielo. At the Pinacoteca of Capodimonte Museum in Naples are four canvases: Selva abbate Cola; Winter Morning; Via in Castrocielo; Stanca (realistic half-figure). He was nominated to be honorary professor of the Academy of Naples and knight of the Order of the Crown of Italy.

References

1840 births
1892 deaths
19th-century Italian painters
Italian male painters
Painters from Naples
Italian romantic painters
19th-century Italian male artists